Dinesh Prabhakar, also known by his birth name Dinesh Nair, is an Indian actor who predominantly appears in Malayalam films.

Early life
Dinesh was born as the second child of Prabhakaran Nair and Sarojini Amma at Pulluvazhi, Perumbavoor, Ernakulam, Kerala. He was passionate about Cinema and Media from the childhood itself. This passion tempted him to discontinue from studies during his college years at Sree Sankara College. Passionate about the movies and fascinated to Hindi language during school days with heavy influence by the Doordarshan serials like Circus (TV series), Humraahi, Tamas (film) and the programs like Chitrahaar & Surabhi (TV series) he then moved to Mumbai in the early 1990's where his elder sister stays. He started to work as a medical shop assistant for a living along with learning the language Hindi. The life in Mumbai played a major role in helping his growth in acting, dubbing, casting any many more roles he has done during his film journey. During his stay in Mumbai he was eagerly trying to get into the silverscreen but in vain. His movie career started with a small role in the film Meesa Madhavan in 2002. This role helped him to bag couple of more roles in main stream Malayalam films. Meanwhile along with his fellow dubbing artist and friend Jismon he started an advertisement agency.

Career
He has started his film career as a dubbing artist for many popular Ad films. He had lent his voice for most of the popular ads which featured Sharukh Khan, Aamir Khan & Amitabh Bachan in the Malayalam versions. Meanwhile along with his fellow dubbing artist and friend Jis Joy he started an advertisement agency. Dubbing and the advertisement agency had become his pathway to the movie field. He is considered as the first casting director of Malayalam film industry.

Personal life
Dinesh is married to Sreerekha. They have a daughter Vibha Nair who is studying now .

Filmography

As actor

Malayalam films

Other Language films

As casting director

As dubbing artist

Television/Web Series

References

External links 
 
 Dreaming Gangster, Casting Life: Behind the Scenes with Dinesh Prabhakar
 Dinesh Prabhakar is excited to have dubbed for Prabhudeva
 On dubbing to Malayalam for Amitabh Bachchan
 The actor who chose Mumbai but not Madras to fulfill his movie ambition
 An Exclusive interview with actor Dinesh Prabhakar | Tharapakittu EP 388 | Part 01 | Kaumudy

1977 births
Living people
Indian male film actors
21st-century Indian male actors
People from Ernakulam district
Male actors in Malayalam cinema
Indian male voice actors
Male actors from Kochi